Paqarin Pawka (Quechua paqarin dawn, morning, pawka a plant (Escallonia herrerae), Hispanicized spelling Pajarinpauca) is a mountain in the Cordillera Central in the Andes of Peru, about  high. It is located in the Lima Region, Yauyos Province, on the border of the districts of Miraflores and Tanta. Paqarin Pawka lies on a ridge northwest of Hatun Pawka and east of a lake named Ch'uspiqucha.

References

Mountains of Peru
Mountains of Lima Region